Edward Albert Trevillian Roberts (10 October 1877 – 2 May 1968) was an Anglican priest.

He was  educated at  Llandovery College and Jesus College, Oxford and ordained in 1901. After curacies in Neath and Cwmbach he was Rector of Llanelly until 1925  when he began a long association with Brecon Cathedral. He was Canon and Sub-Dean until 1939 and then Dean for a further decade.

References

1877 births
People educated at Llandovery College
Alumni of Jesus College, Oxford
Deans of Brecon Cathedral
1968 deaths